John Roxburgh may refer to:

J. F. Roxburgh (John Fergusson Roxburgh; 1888–1954), British schoolmaster and author
Jack Roxburgh (John Maxwell Roxburgh; 1901–1975), Canadian ice hockey administrator and politician
John Roxburgh (footballer) (1901–1965), British footballer
John Roxburgh (minister) (1806–1880), Moderator of the General Assembly of the Free Church of Scotland
John Roxburgh (racing driver) (1932–1993), Australian racing driver
John Roxburgh (Royal Navy officer) (1919–2004), British admiral